Quirijn Jansz Damast (1580 – 1638), was a Dutch linen weaver and mayor of Haarlem, best known today for his portrait painted by Frans Hals.

Biography
Quirijn Damast was the son of Jan Damast Crijnsz from Courtrai. He became a damask weaver like his father, who had come to Haarlem about the time he was born in 1580. Quirijn married Willimijnken Jansdr van der Eynde in 1603. He became a Haarlem councilman in 1627 and was mayor in 1642 and 1674. He was governor of the St. Elisabeth Gasthuis, Haarlem in 1626. In 1633 he became governor of the old men's almshouse and in 1644 he became warden of the orphans. Hals painted him 3rd from right in The Officers of the St George Militia Company in 1639. His daughter's children inherited his estate and the list of linen items in the inventory was quite impressive and was published in 1910.

References

A napkin made by Quirijn Jansz Damast on Metropolitan Museum of Art website

1580 births
1638 deaths
Frans Hals
Mayors of Haarlem
Artists from Haarlem
Dutch weavers